The 1916 United States presidential election in Louisiana took place on November 7, 1916 as part of the 1916 United States presidential election. Voters chose ten representatives, or electors to the Electoral College, who voted for president and vice president.

Background and vote
Ever since the passage of a new constitution in 1898, Louisiana had been a one-party state dominated by the Democratic Party. The Republican Party became moribund due to the disenfranchisement of blacks and the complete absence of other support bases as the Pelican State completely lacked upland or German refugee whites opposed to secession. Despite this absolute single-party dominance, non-partisan tendencies remained strong among wealthy sugar planters in Acadiana and within the business elite of New Orleans.

Following disfranchisement, the state’s politics became dominated by the Choctaw Club of Louisiana, generally called the “Old Regulars”. This political machine was based in New Orleans and united with Black Belt cotton planters. Opposition began to emerge with the Progressive movement in the 1910s, chiefly in the southern sugar-growing parishes, where conflicts with President Wilson’s Underwoood-Simmons Act even allowed a Progressive Party member in Whitmell P. Martin to be elected to the Third Congressional District in 1914.

Whereas Theodore Roosevelt’s Progressive Party disintegrated after the 1914 elections in most states of the United States, in Louisiana it had a brief revival during the following election cycle as John M. Parker, a long-time business progressive and wealthy landowner ran for Governor against Democratic primary winner Ruffin G. Pleasant in April 1916, and at the same time sixteen Progressives were elected to the state legislature, the first time any non-Democrat had been so elected since before the 1898 Constitution. Despite carrying sixteen parishes – mostly in the sugar belt – Parker carried only 38 percent of the vote.

However, this would be the high point of the Progressive movement in Louisiana. Parker was nominated for Vice-President by the national Progressive Party, but when Roosevelt declined the presidential place on this ticket and endorsed national Republican nominee Charles Evans Hughes, the top spot was left empty and Parker endorsed incumbent President Wilson. Despite this, opposition to Wilson’s tariff policy in the sugar parishes was sufficient that the Progressive ticket did very well in this area, becoming the first non-Democrat to carry any Louisiana parish since 1900.

Results

Results by parish

See also
 United States presidential elections in Louisiana

Notes

References

Louisiana
1916
1916 Louisiana elections